Michael Hudson (born February 6, 1967) is a Canadian former professional ice hockey centre who played in the National Hockey League between 1988 and 1997. Since retiring, Mike is married and has four terrific daughters.

Playing career
Hudson grew up playing hockey in his hometown of Guelph, Ontario before advancing to Major Junior Hockey with the Hamilton Steelhawks and Sudbury Wolves. Hudson played for seven NHL teams. At the age of 30 Hudson traveled overseas to play in the Deutsche Eishockey Liga for the Adler Mannheim settling there for two years before retiring in 1999. In 416 NHL games Hudson recorded 49 goals and 87 assists for 136 career points. He won a Stanley Cup championship in 1994 with the New York Rangers.

Career statistics

Regular season and playoffs

External links

1967 births
Living people
Adler Mannheim players
Augsburger Panther players
Canadian expatriate ice hockey players in Germany
Canadian ice hockey centres
Chicago Blackhawks draft picks
Chicago Blackhawks players
Edmonton Oilers players
Hamilton Steelhawks players
Ice hockey people from Ontario
Indianapolis Ice players
New York Rangers players
Phoenix Coyotes players
Phoenix Roadrunners (IHL) players
Pittsburgh Penguins players
St. Louis Blues players
Saginaw Hawks players
Sportspeople from Guelph
Sudbury Wolves players
Toronto Maple Leafs players